Of the more than 800 cattle breeds recognized worldwide, India had 27 acknowledged indigenous breeds of cattle and 7 breeds of buffaloes.  the ICAR recognized 50 breeds that are indigenous in India, of which two cattle breeds and three buffalo breeds were added in 2018. Local conservation programs are endeavouring to maintain the purity of breeds such as Tharparkar, dwarf cattle such as Kasaragod, and Kankrej, Amrit Mahal and Kangayam. On the basis of main uses Indigenous cattle breeds are classified in to milch (cow and buffalloes for milk), draft (load carrying such as ox), and dual purpose (i.e. milk and draf).

All India livestock census (in thousands)

Indigenous cattle breeds of India

Total population and breeds of indigenous cattle of India are as follows:

Newly registered cattle breeds of India

ICAR-National Bureau of Animal Genetic Resources, Karnal (NBAGR) is the nodal agency for the registration of newly identified germplasm of Cattle are:

Indigenous buffalo breeds of India 

Total population and indigenous buffalo breed of India are as follows:

Buffalo Population in India (in million) 
Total Buffalo Population in the country is 109.85 Million during 2019. Total Buffalo has increased by 1.1% over previous Livestock Census (2012). Female Buffalo Population increased by 8.61% whereas Male Buffalo is declined by 42.35% over previous census. About 20.5% of the total livestock is contributed by buffaloes.

Registered Buffalo breed of india 
There are 19 registered Buffalo breed in india under ICAR - NBAGR are as follows

See also

 Animal welfare and rights in India
 Dairy in India
 Fauna of India
 List of endangered animals in India
 List of Indian cattle breeds
 List of Indian state animals
 List of veterinary universities and colleges in India
 Wildlife of India

References

External links 
 Registered Breeds of Indian Cattle - Native Breed.org (2018)

Cattle breeds originating in India